The Mount Pulag tree-mouse (Musseromys beneficus) is a species of rodent in the family Muridae. It is found on Mount Pulag in Luzon, Philippines.

Description 

Three adult specimens were collected, now in the collections of the Field Museum of Natural History (FMNH): 
 an adult female (♀) (FMNH 198713),
 an adult female (♀) (FMNH 198714, holotype),
 an adult male (♂) (FMNH 198857).

Their measurements are as follows :

Conservation 

Data on this species endemic to the Philippines is, as of now, known from only one location. This particularity, alongside lack of knowledge on habitats and potential threats of the species, brought the IUCN to assess the Mount Pulag tree-mouse as "Data Deficient".

References

Musseromys
Mammals described in 2014
Mammals of the Philippines
Endemic fauna of the Philippines